Enallagma vesperum, the vesper bluet, is a species of narrow-winged damselfly in the family Coenagrionidae. It is found in southern Canada and central and eastern United States.

The IUCN conservation status of Enallagma vesperum is "least concern", with no immediate threat to the species' survival. The population is stable.

References

Further reading

 

Coenagrionidae
Articles created by Qbugbot
Insects described in 1919
Odonata of North America
Insects of Canada
Insects of the United States
Taxa named by Philip Powell Calvert